PKS 2155-304 is a BL Lac object, a galaxy hosting a type of blazar. It is a strong emitter from radio to high-energy frequencies.

PKS 2155-304 is at redshift z = 0.116 (Falomo, Pesce & Treves 1993). It is one of the brightest and most studied BL Lacs, one of the first identified through X-ray observations.

References

BL Lacertae objects
Piscis Austrinus